Robert George Deans (19 February 1884 – 30 September 1908) was a New Zealand and Canterbury rugby union footballer. In 1905, Deans entered New Zealand rugby folklore for his disallowed try against Wales in the famous Match of the Century. Deans claimed to have scored a try that would have drawn New Zealand level but was pulled back over the line before the referee could catch up. It was the only match that New Zealand lost in the 35-match tour. Deans was 24 years old when he died as a result of complications arising from an appendix operation.

Family members
Deans' great nephews Bruce Deans and Robbie Deans also played for Canterbury and the All Blacks. Robbie is the former Australian head coach. Jane Deans (died 1911) was his grandmother.

See also 
High School Old Boys RFC

References

External links
 
 

1884 births
1908 deaths
New Zealand international rugby union players
Canterbury rugby union players
People educated at Christchurch Boys' High School
New Zealand rugby union players
Rugby union players from Christchurch
Rugby union centres
Bob